1 Cal Plaza, formerly known as One California Plaza, is a  skyscraper located in the Bunker Hill District of downtown Los Angeles, California. With a second skyscraper, Two California Plaza, it comprises the California Plaza project. The Plaza also is home to the Los Angeles Museum of Contemporary Art, Colburn School of Performing Arts, the Los Angeles Omni Hotel, and a  water court.

Completed in 1985, One California Plaza has  of office space. The towers were designed by Arthur Erickson Architects and named BOMA Building of the Year in 1989.

California Plaza was a ten-year, $1.2 billion project. Started in 1983, the Two California Plaza tower was completed in 1992 during a significant slump in the downtown Los Angeles real estate market. The tower opened with only 30 percent of its space leased and overall vacancy rates in downtown office space neared 25 percent. It was nearly 10 years before significant tall buildings were completed again in downtown Los Angeles. Several clear shots of the building under construction can be seen in the 1983 action helicopter movie Blue Thunder.

California Plaza was originally planned to include 3 high rise tower office buildings instead of the two completed. Three California Plaza at 65 floors, was planned for a site just north of 4th St., directly across Olive St. from California Plaza's first two office highrises and was planned to house the Metropolitan Water District's permanent headquarters.

One California Plaza was purchased on June 6, 2017 by a partnership between Rising Realty Partners and Colony Northstar, Inc.

Tower One was featured in the Nickelodeon television show Drake & Josh as Spin City Records in the episode "Really Big Shrimp".  Tower One was also featured in the HBO television show Westworld season three episode one "Parce Domine" by its GPS coordinates (34.0522° N, -118.2437° W) as the location where "Anomaly Detected: Los Angeles, USA Minor Irregularities. Analysis Required."

See also
List of tallest buildings in Los Angeles

References

External links
 1 Cal Plaza Official Website
 1 Cal Plaza Friendsect Page

Further reading

Office buildings completed in 1985
Arthur Erickson buildings
Skyscraper office buildings in Los Angeles
Bunker Hill, Los Angeles
Leadership in Energy and Environmental Design gold certified buildings